Kishinevsky (also Kishinyivski, Kishinevski, etc.) is a Bessarabian Jewish toponymic surname. Its meaning in Russian language is "somebody from Chișinău" (from the Russian spelling of the place name Kishinev/Kishinyov (Кишинёв); now the place is the capital of Moldova). Its Romanian-language spelling is Chișinevschi.
 Aleksandr Kishinevsky (born 1954), Russian footballer and coach
Iosif Chișinevschi (1905-1963), Jewish Romanian communist 
 (1917-1993), Jewish Romanian and Soviet chemist

See also
Kishinyovsky Uyezd

Russian-language surnames
Romanian-language surnames
Toponymic surnames
Jewish surnames
Russian-Jewish surnames